The river Matton, also named Banel, is a small river in the departement of Ardennes, France. Its uppermost part lies on the border between Belgium and France. It is a tributary of the river Aulnois, joining it at Carignan, also in the Ardennes. The Matton runs from north-east to south-west, passing through the two communes of Matton-et-Clémency and Carignan.

References

Rivers of Ardennes (department)
Rivers of Grand Est
Rivers of France
Belgium–France border
International rivers of Europe
Border rivers
Grand Est region articles needing translation from French Wikipedia